Le Bois-d'Oingt (literally The Wood of Oingt) is a former commune located in the Rhône in the Auvergne-Rhône-Alpes region, in eastern France. On 1 January 2017, Le Bois-d'Oingt, Oingt and Saint-Laurent-d'Oingt merged becoming one commune of Val d'Oingt.

Geography
Le Bois d'Oingt's acreage is of 1.976 square mile (512 hectares), and it lies at 350 meters altitude.

The inhabitants of Bois d’Oingt are called the “buisantins”.

See also
 Communes of the Rhône department

References

Former communes of Rhône (department)
Rhône communes articles needing translation from French Wikipedia